Wojciech Stanisław Ziemniak (born 25 March 1956 in Czempiń) is a Polish politician. He was elected to the Sejm on 25 September 2005, getting 13,193 votes in 36 Kalisz district as a candidate from the Civic Platform list.

See also
List of Sejm members (2005–2007)

References

Members of the Polish Sejm 2005–2007
Civic Platform politicians
1956 births
Living people
Members of the Polish Sejm 2007–2011
Members of the Polish Sejm 2011–2015
Members of the Polish Sejm 2015–2019
Members of the Senate of Poland 2019–2023